This is a list of European Championships medalists in Weightlifting from 1997 to 2010. The list, in order to be complete, miss medalists between 1896 and 1996.

Men

– 56 kg

– 62 kg

– 69 kg

– 77 kg

– 85 kg

– 94 kg

– 105 kg

+ 105 kg

Women

– 48 kg

– 53 kg

– 58 kg

– 63 kg

– 69 kg

– 75 kg

– 90 kg

+ 90 kg

Discounted events

Men

– 52 kg

– 54 kg

– 59 kg

– 60 kg

– 62.5 kg

– 64 kg

– 67.5 kg

– 70 kg

– 72.5 kg

– 75 kg

– 76 kg

– 80 kg

+ 80 kg

– 82.5 kg

+ 82.5 kg

– 83 kg

– 90 kg

– 91 kg

– 99 kg

– 100 kg

– 108 kg

+ 108 kg

– 110 kg

+ 110 kg

Women

– 46 kg

– 50 kg

– 54 kg

– 59 kg

– 64 kg

– 70 kg

+ 75 kg

– 76 kg

– 83 kg

+ 83 kg

References

External links
European Weitlifting Federation
International Weightlifting Federation (IWF)
http://www.chidlovski.net/liftup/l_tournamentForm.asp?tflag=ce
iat.uni-leipzig.de

medalists
European Weightlifting Championships
European Weightlifting Championships
Weightlifting